Messiah (1999) — in French, Le Messie — is a film performance of George Frideric Handel's oratorio Messiah (1741) with accompanying photographs and filmed images (shot in France, the United States and Russia) assembled by American-born French photographer William Klein. The music was directed by Marc Minkowski conducting the Musiciens du Louvre/Grenoble Orchestra and Chorus. Producer was Michel Rotman. The film was a co-production of Kuiv Productions/France 2-Cinema, Canal+ and  La Sofica Gimages 2.

Soloists
Alto – Charlotte Hellekant
Soprano – Lynne Dawson
Soprano – Nicole Heaston
Mezzo-soprano – Magdalena Kožená
Countertenor – Brian Asawa
Tenor – John Mark Ainsley
Baritone – Russel Smythe
Bass – Brian Bannantyne-Scott

External links

French avant-garde and experimental films
1999 films
1990s French-language films
1990s avant-garde and experimental films
Films about classical music and musicians
1990s English-language films
1990s French films